FOTB may refer to:

 Fresh off the boat,  a phrase used to describe immigrants that have not assimilated into the host nation
 Fresh Off the Boat: A Memoir, an autobiography by American food personality Eddie Huang
 Fresh Off the Boat, an American sitcom series loosely inspired by Eddie Huang's life and book
 Father of the Bride (album), the fourth studio album by Vampire Weekend